Myrciaria alta is a species of plant in the family Myrtaceae, endemic to Espírito Santo, Brazil. It was first described in 2019 and it is closely related to Myrciaria glomerata.

Description 
Myrciaria alta is similar in form, structure and appearance to Myrciaria glomerata and Myrciaria strigipes but can reach a much greater height, between 12 and 17 metres tall. The leaves are 60-93 mm long, and it produces flowers, and 20-30mm fruits, on its older woody branches.

Distribution 
Myrciaria alta is endemic to the montane region of Santa Teresa, Espírito Santo in Brazil, at elevations of around 850m.

Etymology 
The species name comes from the Latin , meaning high, and referring to its maximum height compared with Myrciaria glomerata.

Conservation status 
Myrciaria alta is only known from three samples. Its extent of occurrence is 0.281 square kilometres and its habitat is threatened by urban development. The species may be critically endangered.

References

alta
Crops originating from the Americas
Crops originating from Brazil
Tropical fruit
Flora of South America
Endemic flora of Brazil
Fruits originating in South America
Cauliflory
Fruit trees
Berries
Plants described in 2019